Barychelus is a genus of South Pacific brushed trapdoor spiders first described by Eugène Simon in 1889.  it contains only two species, both found on New Caledonia.

References

Barychelidae
Mygalomorphae genera
Spiders of Oceania
Taxa named by Eugène Simon